Fauché or Fauche is a French surname. Notable people with the surname include:

 Christelle Fauche, Swiss tennis player
 Daniel Fauché (born 1966), French rower
 Léon Fauché (1868–1950), French painter
 Louis Fauche-Borel (1762–1829), French counter-revolutionary

French-language surnames